Snufkin (original Swedish: Snusmumrik[en] or Mumrik[en], Finnish: Nuuskamuikkunen) is a character in the Moomin series of books authored by Swedish-speaking Finn Tove Jansson, appearing in six of the nine books; his first appearance is in the second book, Comet in Moominland. He is the best friend of the series' protagonist, Moomintroll, and lives a nomadic lifestyle, only staying in Moominvalley in the spring and summer, but leaving for warmer climates down south every winter. He is the son of the elder Mymble and the Joxter, and is half-brother to the Mymble's daughter and Little My.

Description 
Snufkin wears old green clothes and a wide-brimmed hat that he has had since birth. He lives in a tent, smokes a pipe and plays the harmonica. Snufkin also has a great dislike for authority figures such as the Park Keeper, and the many regulation signs and fences he erects. At one point, he sabotages the Park Keeper by planting Hattifatteners in his garden, causing them to grow and drive him out. He has a great hatred for all symbols of private property, even losing his temper with the Hemulen after the latter attempts to put up a sign declaring "Moominvalley."

The age of Snufkin is difficult to determine. He has had more serious and adulty conversations with Moominpappa as well as being notoriously wise or mysterious. Though, he enjoys playing with Moomintroll and other children, and acts just as childish sometimes. He is also referred to as young and/or a child multiple in the series, and is younger than Little My. In problem situations, others often turn to the help of Snufkin, as he enjoys the unreserved admiration of the inhabitants of the valley for his multi-consciousness. His advice is also followed. There are intersections with a wide range of philosophical views on the way Snufkin thinks. He is undoubtedly one of the most multi-faceted characters in Moomins. Snufkin has said that no one should own more than they can handle, and he cannot understand his friend Sniff’s affection for things and worldly things. Snufkin once even throws his tent in the gorge, because he thinks it is not worth clinging to useless property, but instead can even write a poem when he sees something beautiful.

Inspiration 
Tove Jansson based the character of Snufkin on her friend and one-time fiancé, Atos Wirtanen. A typical feature of Snufkin to come and go independently without caring for others, is inspired by the nature of Atos Wirtanen; at the time, Wirtanen was the center of Jansson's life, but Wirtanen was so busy working as an MP that he came and went, with which their relationship failed. Wirtanen's style has also borrowed the recognizable green hat of Snufkin.

Reception

The character has a mostly positive reception.

References

Bibliography

 
 

Literary characters introduced in 1946
Moomin characters
Fictional hoboes
Male characters in film
Male characters in animation
Male characters in comics
Male characters in literature

ja:スナフキン